The Restless Wave is a Canadian historical television miniseries which aired on CBC Television in 1970.

Premise
This series was a documentary of the Royal Canadian Navy. Episodes included interviews as conducted by Bill Herbert and Sheridan Nelson, supplemented by film materials from Canadian and European sources.

Scheduling
This series was broadcast on Sundays at 4:00 p.m. Eastern from 2 to 16 August 1970.

Episodes
 This opening episode featured the navy's history from its 1910 inception until World War II; one of the first recruits, Rear Admiral Victor G. Brodeur, was featured in an interview
 This episode concentrated on early World War II activity until 1943
 The concluding episode concerned the final years of World War II and events towards the amalgamation of the Navy into the Canadian Armed Forces

References

External links
 

CBC Television original programming
1970 Canadian television series debuts
1970 Canadian television series endings
1970s Canadian documentary television series
History of the Royal Canadian Navy